Fulton may refer to:

People 

 Robert Fulton (1765–1815), American engineer and inventor who developed the first commercially successful steam-powered ship
 Fulton (surname)

Given name
 Fulton Allem (born 1957), South African golfer
 Fulton Burley (1922–2007), Irish-Canadian performer
 Fulton J. Redman (1885–1969), American politician and newspaper editor
 Fulton J. Sheen (1895–1979), Sainthood candidate and American Archbishop and media personality
 Fulton Kuykendall (born 1953), American former footballer
 Fulton Lewis Jr. (1903–1966), American radio broadcaster
 Fulton MacGregor, 21st century Scottish politician
 Fulton Mackay (1922–1987), Scottish comic actor and playwright
 Fulton McGrath (1907–1958), American jazz pianist and songwriter
 Fulton Oursler (1893–1952), American journalist and editor

Places

Canada 
 Fulton, Ontario, a community in West Lincoln, Ontario

United States 
 Fulton, Alabama
 Fulton, Arkansas
 Fulton, California
 Fulton, Illinois
 Fulton, Indiana
 Fulton, Kansas
 Fulton, Kentucky
 Fulton, Maryland
 Fulton, Michigan (disambiguation)
 Fulton, Minneapolis, Minnesota
 Fulton, Mississippi
 Fulton, Missouri
 Fulton, New York (disambiguation),
 Fulton, Ohio
 Fulton, South Dakota
 Fulton, Texas
 George W. Fulton Mansion
 Fulton, Tennessee
 Fulton, Wisconsin, a town
 Fulton (community), Wisconsin, an unincorporated community

Ships 
For naval and merchant ships see Fulton (ship)

Other uses 
 Fulton Beer, an American microbrewery 
 Fulton Financial Corporation, an American financial holding company
 Fulton gap, a discovery in 2017 that it is uncommon for planets to have a size between 1.5 and 2 times that of Earth
 Fulton Gearloose, a Disney character, father of Gyro Gearloose
 Fulton Homes, an American home builder based in Tempe, Arizona
 Fulton Opera House, a venue in Lancaster, Pennsylvania, United States
 Fulton surface-to-air recovery system
 Fulton Umbrellas, a manufacturer of umbrellas in the United Kingdom

See also 
 
 
 Fulton County (disambiguation)
 Fulton Ferry (disambiguation)
 Fulton Township (disambiguation)
 Lord Fulton's committee report, a major review of the UK civil service